Ben Pattison (born 15 December 2001) is an English international athlete. He has represented England at the Commonwealth Games.

Biography
Pattison was educated at Loughborough University won a silver medal at the 2019 Under-20 European Championships. He finished fourth at the 2021 European U23 Championships and in 2022 recorded a personal best of 1.44.6 becoming the second fastest British runner that year.

In 2022, he was selected for the men's 800 metres event at the 2022 Commonwealth Games in Birmingham, where he won a bronze medal.

References

2001 births
Living people
English male middle-distance runners
British male middle-distance runners
Commonwealth Games competitors for England
Athletes (track and field) at the 2022 Commonwealth Games
21st-century English people
Commonwealth Games bronze medallists for England
Commonwealth Games medallists in athletics
Medallists at the 2022 Commonwealth Games